Plants with the common name snake vine include:

Hibbertia scandens, a sprawling plant in the family Dilleniaceae
Stephania japonica, a climbing vine in the family Menispermaceae